The 2006 WDF Europe Cup was the 15th edition of the WDF Europe Cup darts tournament, organised by the World Darts Federation. It was held in Ennis, Ireland from 21–23 August.



Entered teams
19 countries/associations entered a men's selection in the event.

20 countries/associations entered a womans's selection in the event.

Men's singles

Men's Pairs

Men's team
Round Robin

Group A

 Northern Ireland 9–5  England
 Northern Ireland 9–2  Belgium
 Northern Ireland 9–4  Iceland
 England 9–5  Belgium
 England 9–1  Iceland
 Belgium 9–8  Iceland

Group B

 Netherlands 9–5  Denmark
 Netherlands 9–8  Wales
 Netherlands 9–4  Czech Republic
 Denmark 9–5  Germany
 Denmark 9–5  Wales
 Denmark 9–7  Czech Republic
 Germany 9–7  Netherlands
 Germany 9–5  Czech Republic
 Wales 9–8  Germany
 Wales 9–8  Czech Republic

Group C

 Scotland 9–7  Norway
 Scotland 9–3  France
 Scotland 9–3  Russia
 Scotland 9–1  Italy
 Norway 9–5  France
 Norway 9–5  Russia
 Norway 9–4  Italy
 France 9–6  Russia
 Russia 9–6  Italy
 Italy 9–8  France

Group D

 Sweden 9–4  Finland
 Sweden 9–2  Ireland
 Sweden 9–1  Hungary
 Sweden 9–1  Turkey
 Finland 9–2  Ireland
 Finland 9–0  Hungary
 Finland 9–2  Turkey
 Ireland 9–5  Hungary
 Ireland 9–3  Turkey
 Hungary 9–6  Turkey

Knock Out

Woman's singles

Woman's Pairs
Round Robin

Group A

 Trina Gulliver & Clare Bywaters 4–1  Hege Løkken & Mette Engen-Hansen
 Trina Gulliver & Clare Bywaters 4–0  Lenka Schediva & Zuzana Stepanova
 Trina Gulliver & Clare Bywaters 4–0  Rita De Schrijver & Wendy Beutels
 Trina Gulliver & Clare Bywaters 4–1  Janni Larsen & Tina Eggersen
 Hege Løkken & Mette Engen-Hansen 4–2  Rita De Schrijver & Wendy Beutels
 Hege Løkken & Mette Engen-Hansen 4–1  Janni Larsen & Tina Eggersen
 Lenka Schediva & Zuzana Stepanova 4–2  Hege Løkken & Mette Engen-Hansen
 Lenka Schediva & Zuzana Stepanova 4–0  Janni Larsen & Tina Eggersen
 Rita De Schrijver & Wendy Beutels 4–1  Lenka Schediva & Zuzana Stepanova
 Janni Larsen & Tina Eggersen 4–2  Rita De Schrijver & Wendy Beutels
Group B

 Jan Robbins & Julie Gore 4–1  Angela De Ward & Maureen Kelly
 Jan Robbins & Julie Gore 4–0  Josette Kerdraon & Valere Gaudion
 Jan Robbins & Julie Gore 4–2  Irina Armstrong & Anastasia Dobromyslova
 Jan Robbins & Julie Gore 4–0  Asta Lundbergsdottir & Sigridur-Gudrun Jonsdottir
 Angela De Ward & Maureen Kelly 4–2  Josette Kerdraon & Valere Gaudion
 Angela De Ward & Maureen Kelly 4–1  Irina Armstrong & Anastasia Dobromyslova
 Angela De Ward & Maureen Kelly 4–2  Asta Lundbergsdottir & Sigridur-Gudrun Jonsdottir
 Josette Kerdraon & Valere Gaudion 4–3  Irina Armstrong & Anastasia Dobromyslova
 Josette Kerdraon & Valere Gaudion 4–0  Asta Lundbergsdottir & Sigridur-Gudrun Jonsdottir
 Irina Armstrong & Anastasia Dobromyslova 4–0  Asta Lundbergsdottir & Sigridur-Gudrun Jonsdottir

Group C

 Karin Krappen & Francis Hoenselaar 4–1  Sari Nikula & Tarja Salminen  
 Karin Krappen & Francis Hoenselaar 4–2  Maud Jansson & Carina Ekberg
 Karin Krappen & Francis Hoenselaar 4–2  Bianka Strauch & Sabrina Spörle 
 Karin Krappen & Francis Hoenselaar 4–0  Nora Fekete & Zsofia Lazar    
 Sari Nikula & Tarja Salminen 4–1  Maud Jansson & Carina Ekberg 
 Sari Nikula & Tarja Salminen 4–3  Bianka Strauch & Sabrina Spörle
 Sari Nikula & Tarja Salminen 4–1  Nora Fekete & Zsofia Lazar
 Maud Jansson & Carina Ekberg 4–3  Bianka Strauch & Sabrina Spörle
 Maud Jansson & Carina Ekberg 4–0  Nora Fekete & Zsofia Lazar     
 Bianka Strauch & Sabrina Spörle 4–3  Nora Fekete & Zsofia Lazar
Group D

 Anne Kirk & Louise Hepburn 4–0  Dorothy Anderson & Denise Cassidy
 Anne Kirk & Louise Hepburn 4–1  Giada Ciofi & Natalia Farinati
 Anne Kirk & Louise Hepburn 4–1  Meltem Giray & Neslihan Algul-Diniz
 Dorothy Anderson & Denise Cassidy 4–2  Giada Ciofi & Natalia Farinati
 Dorothy Anderson & Denise Cassidy 4–0  Meltem Giray & Neslihan Algul-Diniz
 Giada Ciofi & Natalia Farinati 4–2  Meltem Giray & Neslihan Algul-Diniz

Knock Out

References

Darts tournaments